Jackson Dean Heflin (born March 8, 1998) is an American football defensive end for the Houston Roughnecks of the XFL. He played college football at Northern Illinois and Iowa.

College career
Heflin played college football at Northern Illinois for four seasons, earning second-team all-MAC honors for the Huskies in 2019. In 2020, he transferred to Iowa and started 2020 at defensive tackle next to Daviyon Nixon.

Professional career

Green Bay Packers
In 2021, Heflin signed with the Green Bay Packers as an undrafted free agent, and made the opening day roster. He was released on January 21, 2022. The Packers re-signed Heflin to a futures contract on January 27, 2022, following their playoff exit. He was waived on August 30, 2022, and signed to the practice squad the next day. On December 13, 2022, Heflin was released from the practice squad.

New York Giants
On December 15, 2022, Helfin was signed to the New York Giants practice squad. He was released from the practice squad on January 3, 2023. The Giants re-signed Heflin to their practice squad on January 6, then released four days later.

NFL career statistics

Regular season

References

External links
Northern Illinois Huskies bio
Iowa Hawkeyes bio

1998 births
Living people
American football defensive tackles
American football defensive ends
Northern Illinois Huskies football players
Iowa Hawkeyes football players
Green Bay Packers players
New York Giants players
People from Galesburg, Illinois
Players of American football from Illinois